Maxwell Colony is a Hutterite colony and census-designated place (CDP) in Hutchinson County, South Dakota, United States. The population was 254 at the 2020 census. It was first listed as a CDP prior to the 2020 census.

It is in the southern part of the county, on the southwest side of the James River.

Demographics

References 

Census-designated places in Hutchinson County, South Dakota
Census-designated places in South Dakota
Hutterite communities in the United States